American Stories: Food, Family and Philosophy is a 1989 Belgian drama film directed by Chantal Akerman. It was entered into the 39th Berlin International Film Festival. The film deals with Jewish identity in the center of the U.S.A.

Plot
The film is set in New York City, near Williamsburg Bridge. It follows several people telling their life story.

Cast
 Mark Amitin
 Eszter Balint
 Stephan Balint
 Kirk Baltz
 George Bartenieff
 Billy Bastiani
 Jacob Becker
 Isha Manna Beck
 Max Brandt
 Maurice Brenner
 David Buntzman
 Marilyn Chris
 Sharon Diskin
 Carl Don
 Dean Zeth Jackson as Teitelbaum
 Judith Malina
 Irina V. Passmoore (as Irina Pasmur)
 Herbert Rubens as Martin
 Victor Talmadge

References

External links

1989 films
1980s French-language films
Films about Jews and Judaism
Films set in New York City
1989 crime drama films
Films directed by Chantal Akerman
Belgian drama films